Angela Kirsten Kulikov (born 31 March 1998) is an American tennis player.
She has a career-high doubles ranking of world No. 57, achieved on 24 October 2022.

Kulikov has played college tennis at the University of Southern California (USC).

Career
Kulikov won her first ITF title at the 2019 Thoreau Tennis Open, in the doubles draw, partnering Rianna Valdes.

Kulikov won her first WTA title at the 2022 Hamburg European Open partnering Sophie Chang.

WTA career finals

Doubles: 2 (1 title, 1 runner-up)

WTA Challenger finals

Doubles: 1 (runner-up)

ITF finals

Doubles: 9 (6 titles, 3 runner–ups)

References

External links
 
 

1998 births
Living people
American female tennis players
USC Trojans women's tennis players
American people of Russian descent
Tennis players from Los Angeles